Fayette County Public Schools can refer to:

Fayette County School System (Georgia)
Fayette County Public Schools (Kentucky), part of a consolidated city-county government with Lexington
Fayette County Schools (West Virginia), in Fayette County, West Virginia